John Barry Curtin (May 15, 1867 – May 18, 1925) was a politician from the U.S. state of California.  He was member of California state senate for the 12th district from 1899 to 1915. In 1914, he ran for Governor of California on the Democratic ticket, but lost to incumbent Hiram Johnson.

References

Curtin, John B.
Curtin, John B.
Curtin, John B.
California Democrats
19th-century American politicians
20th-century American politicians